Krichevsky Krithcevsky, or Krychevsky is a Russian and Ukrainian surname. Feminine forms include Krichevskaya and Krychevskaya.

The surname may refer to:
David Kritchevsky (1920-2006), American biochemist of Ukrainian-Jewish descent
 Fedir Krychevsky (1879–1947), Ukrainian early modernist painter, brother of graphic designer Vasyl Krychevsky
 Mikhail Krichevsky (1897–2008), Ukraine's last surviving World War I veteran 
 Mykhailo Krychevsky or Stanisław Krzyczewski or Krzeczowski (died 3 August 1649), Polish noble, military officer and Cossack commander
 Vasyl Krychevsky (1873–1952), Ukrainian painter, architect, art scholar, graphic artist, and master of applied art and decorative art, brother of Ukrainian painter Fedir Krychevsky

Russian-language surnames
Ukrainian-language surnames